Maurice Ravel's Piano Concerto in G major, was composed between 1929 and 1931. The concerto is in three movements, with a total playing time of a little over 20 minutes. Ravel said that in this piece he was not aiming to be profound but to entertain, in the manner of Mozart and Saint-Saëns. Among its other influences are jazz and Basque folk music.

The first performance was given in Paris in 1932 by the pianist Marguerite Long, with the Orchestre Lamoureux conducted by the composer. Within months the work was heard in the major cities of Europe and in the US. It has been recorded many times by pianists, orchestras and conductors from all over the world.

Background and first performance

The concerto was Ravel's penultimate composition. He had contemplated a piano concerto, based on Basque themes, in 1906; he returned to the idea in 1913, but abandoned work on the piece in 1914. Fifteen years elapsed before he turned once more to the idea of writing a concerto. He began sketching it in 1929 but throughout his career he had been a slow, painstaking worker, and it was nearly three years before the concerto was finished. He was obliged to put it to one side while he worked to a deadline to write another concerto, the D major, for the left hand, commissioned by Paul Wittgenstein.

The biographer Arbie Orenstein writes that while touring the US in 1928, Ravel had been "impressed by its jazz, Negro spirituals and the excellence of its orchestras". Jazz had been popular in Paris since the start of the decade: Ravel had first heard, and enjoyed, it in 1921, and its influence is heard in the violin sonata, completed in 1927, and in the D major piano concerto. The Basque theme mooted in 1906 and 1913 was not wholly abandoned. His colleague Gustave Samazeuilh believed that Ravel drew on his earlier ideas for the outer movements of the G major concerto, and Orenstein notes a Basque influence in the opening theme of the work.

In an interview with the music critic Pierre Leroi, published in October 1931, Ravel said:

He had intended to be the soloist in the first public performance of the new work, but fatigue, poor health and pressure of work led him to offer the premiere to Marguerite Long, to whom he dedicated the concerto. Long, who was known for her performances of the works of Fauré and Debussy had earlier asked Ravel for a new work. She received the completed score on 11 November 1931, and played the concerto at the Salle Pleyel on 14 January 1932, with Ravel conducting the Orchestre Lamoureux.

A few days after the premiere, Ravel and Long began a European tour with the concerto, playing in sixteen cities, starting in Antwerp and including Brussels, Vienna, Bucharest, Prague, London, Warsaw, Berlin, Amsterdam and Budapest. The first North American performances were given on 22 April 1932, in Boston and Philadelphia.

Instrumentation
Ravel told Leroi, "In order not to needlessly weigh down the orchestral texture, I called for a reduced orchestra: the usual strings are joined only by one flute, piccolo, oboe, cor anglais, two bassoons, two horns, one trumpet and one trombone". Orenstein points out that Ravel, or Leroi, forgot to mention two clarinets and the extensive range of percussion instruments.
The full tally of instruments, apart from the piano, comprises piccolo, flute, oboe, cor anglais, E clarinet, clarinet in B and A, 2 bassoons, 2 horns in F, trumpet in C, trombone, timpani, triangle, snare drum, cymbals, bass drum, tamtam, wood block, whip, harp, 16 violins, 6 violas, 6 cellos, and 4 double basses.

Structure

The concerto typically plays for about 22 minutes.

I. Allegramente 
The first movement, in G major, is in  time. It opens with a single sharp whip-crack, followed by an exposition that contains five distinct themes. Orenstein says of them that the first suggests a Basque folk melody, the second the influence of Spain, and the other three derive from the idiom of jazz. The development section – "a lively romp" – is followed by a cadenza-like passage leading to the recapitulation. Where a cadenza might be expected in such a concerto movement, Ravel writes three: first for harp, then for the woodwind, and finally for the piano; the last of these draws on the fifth theme of the exposition. An extended coda concludes the movement, bringing back some of the material from the development section and finishes with a series of descending major and minor triads.

II. Adagio assai
The slow movement, in E major, is in  time. In contrast with the preceding movement, it is a tranquil subject of Mozartian serenity written in ternary form. Ravel said of it, "That flowing phrase! How I worked over it bar by bar! It nearly killed me!" The first theme is presented by the piano, unaccompanied. Ravel said he took as his model the theme from the Larghetto of Mozart's Clarinet Quintet, but in an analysis of the work published in 2000 Michael Russ comments that whereas the Mozart melody unfolds across 20 bars, Ravel builds an even longer – 34-bar – melody, without repeating a single bar. The musicologist Michel Fleury calls the opening an "extended monologue in the style of a stately Sarabande", and remarks that it derives "its curiously hypnotic character" from the rhythmic discrepancy between the  time signature of the melody in the right hand and the  signature of the accompaniment. After thirty bars – about three minutes in a typical performance – the  solo flute enters with a C and oboe, clarinet and flute carry the melody into the second theme. There follows a more dissonant episode, imbued with what Fleury calls a slight sense of trepidation; the orchestra plays slowly ascending chord progressions while the piano part consists of "iridescent harmonies". The cor anglais reintroduces the opening theme beneath the piano's "delicate filigree in the high register".

III. Presto
The finale, in G major, is in  time. At just under four minutes in a typical performance it is much the shortest of the three. Four brisk chords at the beginning launch what Fleury describes as "an unstoppable onslaught, spurred on by the shrieks of the clarinet and the piccolo, the donkey brays of the trombone and occasional fanfare flourishes in the brass". Orenstein finds the opening recalls the carnival atmosphere of Stravinsky's Petrushka or Satie's Parade. The solo part begins with a series of demisemiquavers marked to be played piano – a technically demanding combination. The music progresses through several modes before coming to its conclusion with the same four chords with which the movement begins. Reviewing the premiere of the work, Henry Prunières wrote, "The spirit of jazz indeed animates this last movement ... but with extreme discretion".
Recordings
The first recording of the concerto, made in 1932, featured Marguerite Long as soloist with an ad hoc orchestra of the best players in Paris, conducted, according to the label, by the composer. In fact Ravel supervised the recording sessions, while a more proficient conductor, Pedro de Freitas Branco, took the baton.

The many later recordings include:

Source: WorldCat.

Trivia
 Jacques Brel used phrases of the second movement of Ravel's Piano Concerto in G in his chanson Les Désespérés.

Notes, references and sources

Notes

References

Sources

Further reading

External links
 
 Program notes from the New York Philharmonic (PDF)
 Concerto pour piano et orchestre en sol majeur at Piano Society

Ravel Concerto in G
Compositions by Maurice Ravel
1931 compositions
Compositions in G major
Music with dedications